Kality is a rural locality (a village) in Mstyora Urban Settlement, Vyaznikovsky District, Vladimir Oblast, Russia. The population was 1 as of 2010.

Geography 
Kality is located 19 km northwest of Vyazniki (the district's administrative centre) by road. Timino is the nearest rural locality.

References 

Rural localities in Vyaznikovsky District